Ngau Tau Kok Ferry Pier (1953 - 1960s) was a ferry pier in Ngau Tau Kok in Kwun Tong District, Kowloon, Hong Kong. Its location is now near Wharf T&T Square, Wai Yip Street.

The pier started operation in 1953 and it provided ferry service to Wan Chai and walla-walla service to North Point respectively. In the 1960s, it was relocated to the junction of Hoi Bun Road and Tsun Yip Street to cope with the land reclamation and it was renamed to "Kwun Tong Ferry Pier".

References

Demolished piers in Hong Kong
Ngau Tau Kok
Victoria Harbour
1953 establishments in Hong Kong